Siraj-ud-Daulah (born Mirza Muhammad Siraj ud-Daulah)  (1733 – 2 July 1757),  was the last independent Nawab of Bengal, reigning from 1756 to 1757. The end of his reign marked the beginning of the rule of the East India Company over Bengal and later almost all of the Indian subcontinent.

Siraj ascended to the masnad on 9 April 1756, following the death of  his maternal grandfather, Alivardi Khan, at the age of 23. Betrayed by Mir Jafar, the commander of Nawab's army, Siraj lost the Battle of Plassey on 23 June 1757. The forces of the East India Company under Robert Clive invaded and the administration of Bengal fell into the hands of the company. Siraj ud daulah attempted to escape, but Mir Jafar seized him and brought him to his residence. He held the nawab by the waist and captured him, Siraj was executed on 2 July 1757.

Early life

Siraj was born to the family of Mirza Muhammad Hashim and Amina Begum in 1733. Soon after his birth, Alivardi Khan, Siraj's maternal grandfather, was appointed the Deputy Governor of Bihar. Amina Begum was the youngest daughter of Alivardi Khan and Princess Sharfunnisa, the paternal aunt of Mir Jafar. His father, Mirza Muhammad Hashim was the youngest son of Haji Ahmad, the elder brother of Alivardi Khan. Siraj's great-grandfather was Mirza Muhammad Madani, who was of either of Arab or Turkic ancestry, the son of a foster-brother of the Mughal emperor Aurangzeb; Madani himself began his career as a cup-bearer under the latter's son Azam Shah. His great-grandmother belonged to the Turkic Afshar tribe of Khorasan. Through her, he was a grandnephew of Shuja-ud-Din Muhammad Khan, the two having shared a common ancestor in Nawab Aqil Khan.

Siraj was regarded as the "fortune child" of the family. He received the special affection of his grandfather and was raised at the Nawab's palace with all necessary education and training suitable for a future Nawab. Young Siraj also accompanied Alivardi on his military ventures against the Marathas in 1746. In 1750, Siraj revolted against his grandfather and seized Patna, but quickly surrendered and was forgiven. In May 1752, Alivardi declared Siraj as his successor. The former later died on 9 April 1756 at the age of eighty.

Reign as Nawab

Siraj ud-Daulah's nomination to the Nawab ship aroused the jealousy and enmity of his maternal aunt, Ghaseti Begum (Mehar un-Nisa Begum), Mir Jafar, Jagat Seth (Mehtab Chand) and Shaukat Jang (Siraj's cousin). Ghaseti Begum possessed huge wealth, which was the source of her influence and strength. Apprehending serious opposition from her, Siraj ud-Daulah seized her wealth from Motijheel Palace and placed her under confinement. The Nawab also made changes in high government positions by giving them to his own favourites. Mir Madan was appointed Bakshi (paymaster of the army) in place of Mir Jafar. Mohanlal was elevated to the rank of Peshkar (court-clerk) of his Dewan-khane and he exercised great influence in the administration. Eventually, Siraj suppressed Shaukat Jang, governor of Purnia, who was killed in a clash.

Black Hole of Calcutta 

During this period, the British East India Company was increasing their influence in the Indian subcontinent, particularly in Bengal; Siraj soon grew to resent the politico-military presence of the East India Company in Bengal. In particular, he was angered at the Company's alleged involvement with and instigation of some members of his own court to a conspiracy to oust him. His charges against the company were broadly threefold. Firstly, that they strengthened the fortification around the Fort William without any intimation or approval; secondly, that they grossly abused trade privileges granted them by the Mughal rulers – which caused heavy loss of customs duties for the government; and thirdly, that they gave shelter to some of his officers, for example, Krishnadas, son of Rajballabh, who fled Dhaka after misappropriating government funds. Hence, when the East India Company began further enhancement of military strength at Fort William in Calcutta, Siraj ud-Daulah ordered them to stop. The Company did not heed his directives; consequently, Siraj retaliated and captured Calcutta (for a short while renamed Alinagar) from the British in June 1756. The Nawab gathered his forces together and took Fort William. The British captives were placed in the prison cell as a temporary holding by a local commander, but there was confusion in the Indian chain of command, and the captives were left there overnight, and many of them died.

Sir William Meredith, during the Parliamentary inquiry into Robert Clive's actions in India, vindicated Siraj ud-Daulah of any charge surrounding the Black Hole incident:
"A peace was however agreed upon with Surajah Dowlah; and the persons who went as ambassadors to confirm that peace formed the conspiracy, by which he was deprived of his kingdom and his life."

Conspiracy of British
The Nawab was infuriated on learning of the attack on Chandernagar. His former hatred of the British returned, but he now felt the need to strengthen himself by alliances against the British. The Nawab was plagued by fear of attack from the north by the Afghans under Ahmad Shah Durrani and from the west by the Marathas. Therefore, he could not deploy his entire force against the British for fear of being attacked from the flanks. A deep distrust set in between the British and the Nawab. As a result, Siraj started secret negotiations with Jean Law, Chief of the French factory at Cossimbazar, and de Bussy.

Popular discontent against the Nawab flourished in his own court. The Seths, the traders of Bengal, were in perpetual fear for their wealth under the reign of Siraj, contrary to the situation under Alivardi's reign. They had engaged Yar Lutuf Khan to defend them in case they were threatened in any way. William Watts, the Company representative at the court of Siraj, informed Clive about a conspiracy at the court to overthrow the ruler. The conspirators included Mir Jafar, the paymaster of the army, Rai Durlabh, Yar Lutuf Khan and Omichund (Amir Chand), a Sikh merchant, and several officers in the army. When communicated in this regard by Mir Jafar, Clive referred it to the select committee in Calcutta on 1 May. The committee passed a resolution in support of the alliance. A treaty was drawn up between the British and Mir Jafar to raise him to the throne of the Nawab in return for support to the British in the field of battle and the bestowal of large sums of money upon them as compensation for the attack on Calcutta. On 2 May, Clive broke up his camp and sent half the troops to Calcutta and the other half to Chandernagar.

Mir Jafar and the Seths desired that the confederacy between the British and himself be kept secret from Omichund, but when he found out about it, he threatened to betray the conspiracy if his share was not increased to three million rupees (£300,000). Hearing of this, Clive suggested an expedient to the committee. He suggested that two treaties be drawn – the real one on white paper, containing no reference to Omichund and the other on red paper, containing Omichund's desired stipulation, to deceive him. The Members of the Committee signed on both treaties, but Admiral Watson signed only the real one and his signature had to be counterfeited on the fictitious one. Both treaties and separate articles for donations to the army, navy squadron and committee were signed by Mir Jafar on 4 June.

Lord Clive testified and defended himself thus before the House of Commons of Parliament on 10 May 1773, during the Parliamentary inquiry into his conduct in India:

Battle of Plassey

The Battle of Plassey (or Palashi) is widely considered the turning point in the history of the subcontinent, marking the start of British rule in India. After Siraj-ud-Daulah's conquest of Calcutta, the British sent fresh troops from Madras to recapture the fort and avenge the attack. A retreating Siraj-ud-Daulah met the British at Plassey. He had to make camp 27 miles away from Murshidabad. On 23 June 1757 Siraj-ud-Daulah called on Mir Jafar because he was saddened by the sudden fall of Mir Mardan who was a very dear companion of Siraj in battles. The Nawab asked for help from Mir Jafar. Mir Jafar advised Siraj to retreat for that day. The Nawab made the blunder in giving the order to stop the fight. Following his command, the soldiers of the Nawab were returning to their camps. At that time, Robert Clive attacked the soldiers with his army.

At such a sudden attack, the army of Siraj became undisciplined and could think of no way to fight. Much of the army retreated, betrayed by a conspiracy plotted by Jagat Seth, Mir Jafar, Krishna Chandra and Omichund among other; Siraj lost the battle and had to escape. He rode away and went first to Murshidabad, specifically to Heerajheel or Motijheel, his palace at Mansurganj. He ordered his principal commanders to engage their troops for his safety, but as he was bereft of power due to the loss at Plassey, they were reluctant to offer unquestioning support. Some advised him to deliver himself up to the English, but Siraj equated this with treachery. Others proposed he should encourage the army with greater rewards, and this he seemed to approve of. Yet the numbers in his retinue were considerably diminished. Soon he dispatched most of the women of his harem to Purneah, under the protection of Mohanlal, with gold and elephants. Then, with his principal consort Lutf-un-Nisa and very few attendants, Siraj began his escape towards Patna by boat, but Mir jafar's soldiers reached the spot and seized him. They held Siraj by the waist and captured him. They brought him back to the Palace and locked him in the prison.

Death

Mir Jafar held Siraj-ud-Daulah by the waist and dragged him out of the prison. He tied Siraj by a waist chain and brought him forcibly to Namak Haram Deorhi on 2 July 1757. Siraj-ud-Daulah was executed on 2 July 1757 by Mohammad Ali Beg under orders from Mir Miran, son of Mir Jafar in Namak Haram Deorhi as part of the agreement between Mir Jafar and the British East India Company.

Siraj-ud-Daulah's tomb is located at Khushbagh, Murshidabad. It is marked with a simple but elegant one-storied mausoleum, surrounded by gardens.

Criticism
Siraj ud-Daulah has gained a positive reputation in India, Bangladesh, and Pakistan for his opposition to the beginning of British rule over India.

In 1985, Sarkar wrote:
After the death of Alivardii Khan, his immature grandson became the nawab of Bengal, taking the name Miirza Mohammed Siraj-Ud-Daola. In addition to his young age, he had many kinds of defects in his character and conduct.

Historian Sushil Chaudhary argued that Siraj ud-Daula's villainous character is a misrepresentation.

Legacy
The end of Siraj ud-Daulah's reign also ended Bengali autonomy and marked the beginning of British power in India. In the Bengali version of the end of his rule, Mir Jafar and Robert Clive are the villains and Siraj is the victim. Even though he is rarely if ever depicted as an attractive person, he is regarded as having been sinned against, rather than as a sinner. As the movement for Indian independence gathered strength, Siraj along with Tipu Sultan and the heroes of the First War of Indian Independence including the last Mughal Emperor, Bahadur Shah II, gained iconic status as people who resisted the imperial aggression. In Bangladesh, he is regarded as the last legitimate ruler until Sheikh Mujibur Rahman emerged as leader following independence from Pakistan in 1971, a gap of some two hundred and fourteen years or so.

Siraj's legacy has become the subject of cultural war between those who want to offer some moral defense for Western imperialism as a civilizing mission and those who see the colonial period as one in which the strong exploited the weak, and reject the contention that Europe had much to offer India in terms of culture or that Europeans conducted themselves in a morally superior way.

Namesakes
 Siraj ud Daula College, Karachi, Pakistan
 Nawab Siraj-ud-Daulah Government College, Natore, Bangladesh
 Masjid-e-Siraj ud-Daulah, Bangladesh
 Siraj-ud-Daula Road, Karachi
 Nabab Siraj ud-Daulah Road, Chittagong, Bangladesh
 Nawab Siraj-Ud-Daulah Sarani, Kolkata, India
 Siraj ud-Daulah Park, Old Dhaka, Bangladesh
 Siraj-ud-Doula Hall, Sher-e-Bangla Agricultural University, Bangladesh
 Nawab Siraj Ud-Daulah College, Kushtia, Bangladesh
 Siraj-ud-Daula Road, Kushtia, Bangladesh
 Nawab Siraj ud-Daulah Hospital, Bangladesh
 Nawab Siraj ud Daulah Road, Narayanganj, Bangladesh

In popular culture 
Shiraz-Ud-Dowla (1927), Indian silent film directed by Dhanjibhai K. Desai.
Sirajuddaula (1938), musical opera by Nimalendu Lahiri.
Siraj-Ud-Dowla (1952), Indian Bengali-language film directed by Amar Dutta.
Ami Sirajer Begam (1960), historical novel set in Bengal by Sri Parabat.
Sirajuddaula (1965), play by Sikandar Abu Zafar.
Nawab Sirajuddaula (1967), an Indian Bengali-language film directed by Ramchandra Thakur, starring Bharat Bhushan.
Nawab Sirajuddaula (1967), a Bangladeshi film directed by Khan Ataur Rahman featuring Anwar Hossain.
Ami Sirajer Begam (1973), an Indian Bengali-language film directed by Sushil Mukhopadhyay, starring Ajitesh Bandopadhyay. Based on the 1960 novel by Sri Parabat.
Nawab Sirajuddaula (1989), remake of the 1967 film by Khan Ataur Rahman.
Ami Sirajer Begum (2018), Indian Bengali-language historical television soap opera.
Zindabahar Bangladeshi TV-series directed by Bangladesh Television
Chayamanab (2022), historical Bengali novel by Soumen Jana.

See also
 Nawabs of Bengal
 List of rulers of Bengal
 History of Bengal
 History of Bangladesh
 History of India
 Shia Islam in India
 Battle of Chandannagar

Notes

  
   link to searchable text at the Packard Humanities Institute

References

Sources 
 Akhsaykumar Moitrayo, Sirajuddaula, Calcutta 1898
 BK Gupta, Sirajuddaulah and the East India Company, 1756–57, Leiden, 1962
 Kalikankar Datta, Sirajuddaulah, Calcutta 1971

External links
 Siraj in Murshidabad

1733 births
1757 deaths
Nawabs of Bengal
Mughal Empire people
18th-century Indian monarchs